Synaptobrevin-like protein 1 (SYBL1), also known as vesicle-associated membrane protein 7 (VAMP7), is a protein that in humans is encoded by the VAMP7, or SYBL1, gene.

Function 

SYBL1 is a transmembrane protein that is a member of the soluble N-ethylmaleimide-sensitive factor attachment protein receptor (SNARE) family. SYBL1 localizes to late endosomes and lysosomes and is involved in the fusion of transport vesicles to their target membranes.

Interactions 

SYBL1 has been shown to interact with SNAP23 and AP3D1.

References

Further reading

External links